The SNCAC NC.1070 was a piston engined attack and torpedo bomber designed and built in France shortly after World War II.  The second prototype, the NC1071, was the first French multi-jet turbine powered aircraft.

Design and development

Built shortly after World War II, the NC.1070 was a contemporary of the Nord 1500 Noréclair and was intended to take a similar role. It was a twin engine aircraft of unconventional layout with twin booms, twin fins and a double horizontal tail. The central fuselage was not a pod, though short compared with the wing span, and extended beyond the tail.

The NC.1070 was powered by a pair of SNECMA 14R fourteen-cylinder, two-row, air-cooled radial engines mounted well ahead of the wing.  The fairings behind them extended around the wings and beyond as booms; at their rear, rectangular fixed tailplanes linked the booms to the fuselage. A straight tapered fin and rudder with trim tabs was mounted at the end of each boom with a constant chord, round tipped main tailplane mounted on top of them, carrying a one-piece elevator.

The wings were mid-mounted and strongly tapered with slightly swept leading edges and marked curvature on the trailing edges. They were fitted with tabbed ailerons and flaps. There were three crew, a bomb aimer/observer housed in a partially glazed nose, the pilot in a conventional cockpit which merged into a raised rear fuselage and, in the extreme tail just beyond the fins, a rear gunner in a turret. The NC.1070 had retractable tricycle gear, the nose leg slightly offset to port and each leg with a large single wheel.

The NC.1070 was first flown on 23 May 1947.  Tests continued into 1948 but, piloted by Fernand Lasne, it was seriously damaged in a belly landing at Toussus-le-Noble Airport on 9 March 1948 and did not fly again.  Instead, SNCAC concentrated on the jet powered second prototype, the NC.1071.

This was powered by a pair of  Rolls-Royce Nenes, mounted in booms like the piston engines of the NC.1070, though rather further forward, positioned below the wing and with their tailpipes emerging from the previously pointed boom ends.  Because of the lowered booms/tailpipes the lower, fixed horizontal tail was removed. The rear gun position was replaced by a partially glazed observer's position and the bottom of the rudder was clipped to avoid the jet exhaust. Apart from these engine induced changes the NC.1071 was aerodynamically very similar to the NC.1070, with the same dimensions and only  heavier empty. Its maximum speed was increased by nearly 40% at altitude and it had a greater ceiling, but its range, much reduced, was only 

The NC.1071 made its first flight on 12 October 1948. It suffered damage to its undercarriage on 27 April 1949, flew again in 1950 and was modified the following May after significant structural distortion appeared in flight.  Though both an all weather fighter variant (NC.1072) and an attack bomber (NC.1073) were considered, they were not built and development was abandoned at the end of NC.1071's flight tests.

Variants
NC.1070 The piston engined first prototype. Abandoned after landing accident on 9 March 1948. 
NC.1071 Rolls-Royce Nene-powered second prototype, first flown 12 October 1948.  The first French multi-jet aircraft.

Specifications (NC.1070)

References

Bibliography
 Buttler, Tony. X-Planes of Europe II: Military Prototype Aircraft from the Golden Age 1946–1974. Manchester, UK: Hikoki Publications, 2015. 
 

Twin-boom aircraft
107
1940s French bomber aircraft
Twinjets
Mid-wing aircraft
Aircraft first flown in 1947
Twin piston-engined tractor aircraft